WTKY-FM (92.1 FM 1370 AM) is a radio station  broadcasting a Country format. Licensed to Tompkinsville, Kentucky, United States, the station serves the Bowling Green area.  The station is currently owned by Jonathan Keeton, through licensee Frank Keeton Aircasters, Inc.

References

External links

TKY-FM
TKY-FM
Tompkinsville, Kentucky